Douglas Allan  (born 1951) is a Scottish wildlife cameraman and photographer best known for his work in polar regions and underwater.

Biography
Allan is one of twin brothers born in Dunfermline in Scotland, the son of a photographer and photojournalist who ran his own photography shop in the town. As a child Allan became a keen snorkeller and underwater diver, which inspired him to study marine biology at the University of Stirling. His first job was as a pearl diver with Bill Abernathy, the last pearl hunter in Scotland. Allan then worked for eight years for the British Antarctic Survey in Antarctica as a research diver, scientist and photographer.

Becoming a full time cinematographer in 1985, Allan has been a principal cameraman on many BBC wildlife programmes, particularly concerning extreme environments, including Life in the Freezer, Wildlife Special: Polar Bear, The Blue Planet, Planet Earth, and Frozen Planet.

Allan has won eight Emmys including "Outstanding Cinematography for Nonfiction Programming in 2002, for Blue Planet, and in 2007, for Planet Earth. He has won four BAFTAs and in 2017 he won an outstanding contribution award at the British Academy Scotland Awards. He frequently gives illustrated lectures and talks, including at the 2016 Cambridge University Expedition Society annual dinner.

In 2012, Allan was awarded an Honorary Fellowship of the Royal Photographic Society.

He appeared on BBC Radio 4's The Museum of Curiosity in November 2019. His hypothetical donation to this imaginary museum was "The feeling you get when a wild animal trusts you".

References

External links

Thomas Tolkien Website

Living people
1951 births
People from Dunfermline
Scottish twins
Alumni of the University of Stirling
British Antarctic Survey
Nature photographers
Underwater photographers
Scottish underwater divers
Recipients of the Polar Medal
BAFTA winners (people)
News & Documentary Emmy Award winners